Bhogpur is a town and a nagar panchayat in Jalandhar district  in the state of Punjab, India. Bhogpur is the first city from the overall india who created its own website on city name. Bhogpur sugar mill is first Co-operative sugar mill and still running successfully.

Geography 

Demographics 
 India census, Bhogpur had a population of 13,893. Males constitute 53% of the population and females 47%.  Bhogpur has an average literacy rate of 75%, higher than the national average of 59.5%; with male literacy of 79% and female literacy of 70%. 11% of the population is under 6 years of age.

See also
Akhara, Bhogpur
Laroi

References 

Cities and towns in Jalandhar district